Tumkur Lok Sabha constituency is one of the 28 Lok Sabha constituencies in Karnataka state in southern India.

Assembly segments
Tumkur Lok Sabha constituency presently comprises the following eight Legislative Assembly segments:

Members of Parliament

^ denotes by-poll

Election results

See also
 List of Constituencies of the Lok Sabha
 Madhugiri Lok Sabha constituency
 Tiptur Lok Sabha constituency
 Tumkur district

References

External links
Tumkur lok sabha  constituency election 2019 date and schedule

Lok Sabha constituencies in Karnataka
Tumkur district